Events from the year 1898 in Denmark.

Incumbents
 Monarch – Christian IX
 Prime minister – Hugo Egmont Hørring

Events

Undated

Publications
 Henrik Pontoppidan's Lykke–Per vol. I (Lucky Per, 2010)

Births
 11 January – Hans Kirk, author (d. 1962)
 13 January – Kaj Munk, playwright and Lutheran priest (d. 1944)
 9 February – Steen Eiler Rasmussen, architect and writer (d. 1990)
 2 March – Mogens Koch, architect and designer (d. 1992)
 17 May – Carl Hansen, footballer (d. 1978)
 31 October – C. F. Møller, architect (d. 1988)

Deaths
 29 September – Louise of Hesse-Kassel, queen consort of Christian IX (b. 1863)

References

 
1890s in Denmark
Denmark
Years of the 19th century in Denmark